Dioscorea japonica, known as East Asian mountain yam, yamaimo, or Japanese mountain yam, is a type of yam (Dioscorea) native to Japan (including Ryukyu and Bonin Islands), Korea, China, Taiwan, and Assam.

Dioscorea japonica is used for food.  Jinenjo, also called the wild yam, is a related variety of Japanese yam that is used as an ingredient in soba noodles.

Names 

In Chinese, Dioscorea japonica is known as yě shānyào which translates to English as "wild Chinese yam" or simply "wild yam". Another name is Rìběn shǔyù (literally "Japanese yam").

In Korean, it is known as cham ma, as well as dang ma.

Chemistry 
Dioscorea japonica contains the antimutagenic compounds eudesmol and paeonol.

Varieties 
Several formal botanical varieties have been proposed. Four are accepted:

 Dioscorea japonica var. japonica - Japan (Ryukyu, Bonin), Korea, Taiwan, China (Anhui, Fujian, Guangdong, Guangxi, Guizhou, Hubei, Hunan, Jiangsu, Jiangxi, Sichuan, Zhejiang)
 Dioscorea japonica var. nagarum Prain & Burkill - India (Assam)
 Dioscorea japonica var. oldhamii R.Knuth - China (Guangdong, Guangxi), Taiwan
 Dioscorea japonica var. pilifera C.T.Ting & M.C.Chang - China (Anhui, Fujian, Guangxi, Guizhou, Hubei, Hunan, Jiangsu, Jiangxi, Zhejiang)

Uses 

In Japanese cuisine, both the Japanese yam and the introduced Chinese yam are used interchangeably in dishes and recipes.

References 

japonica
Root vegetables
Flora of China
Flora of Eastern Asia
Flora of Assam (region)
Plants described in 1784